Platone Parish is an administrative unit of Jelgava Municipality in the Semigallia region of Latvia (Prior to the 2009 administrative reforms it was part of Jelgava District).

Towns, villages and settlements of Platone parish

References 

Parishes of Latvia
Jelgava Municipality
Semigallia